The Kessler's gudgeon (Romanogobio kesslerii) is a European species of freshwater fish in the family Cyprinidae. It is found in the Danube and Vistula drainage basins, including parts of Poland, Austria, the Czech Republic, Ukraine, Bulgaria, Romania, Moldova, Hungary, Croatia, Bosnia and Herzegovina, Serbia, Montenegro, Slovakia, and Slovenia. It is a small fish of no economic or sporting importance. It was at one time classified as Gobio kessleri.

Named in honor of German-Russian zoologist Karl Federovich Kessler (1815-1881).

Description
It has a pair of barbels by the mouth which help it locate food and which are long enough to reach to the far side of the eye. The throat is scale-less and there are 40 to 42 scales along the lateral line. The dorsal fin is made up of eight or nine branched rays.

Distribution and habitat
Kessler's gudgeon is found in rivers and streams in the Danube basin and favours stretches of fast-flowing water with sandy bottoms where the gradient begins to ease off at the foot of the mountains. It is also known from the San River system within the Vistula drainage area.

Biology
Kessler's gudgeon is gregarious and feeds on invertebrates that lie on the river bed and prey that drifts past on the current.

Adults mature at two to three years of age and spawning takes place in summer. The fish congregate in shallow areas with sandy or gravelly substrates and rise to the surface. The females release their eggs in batches and the males release their milt. The eggs gradually sink to the bottom where they stick to stones and weeds.

Status
Kessler's gudgeon is listed as of "Least Concern" by the IUCN Red List of Threatened Species. There is some pollution of the rivers in which it lives and economic development on their banks. Its numbers are declining slowly but it is a common species and does not currently warrant a higher level category.

References

Romanogobio
Freshwater fish of Europe
Taxa named by Benedykt Dybowski
Fish described in 1862
Taxonomy articles created by Polbot